Galmae Station is a railway station of the Gyeongchun Line in Guri-si, Gyeonggi-do.

Station Layout

Gallery

Metro stations in Guri
Seoul Metropolitan Subway stations
Railway stations opened in 1939